Kirner is a surname of German origin. Notable people with the surname include:

Gary Kirner (born 1942), American football player
Joan Kirner (1938–2015), Australian politician 
Johann Baptist Kirner (1806-1866), German painter
Randy Kirner (born 1946), American politician

References

Surnames of German origin